The Riviere Building is a historic commercial building located at 405 West 3rd Street in Thibodaux, Louisiana.

Built in 1900, the structure is a two-story brick Italianate style commercial building with an elaborate pressed metal front. The facade has been completely restored sometime between 2013 and 2016.

The building was listed on the National Register of Historic Places on March 5, 1986.

It is one of 14 individually NRHP-listed properties in the "Thibodaux Multiple Resource Area", which also includes:
Bank of Lafourche Building
Breaux House
Building at 108 Green Street
Chanticleer Gift Shop
Citizens Bank of Lafourche
Grand Theatre
Lamartina Building
McCulla House
Peltier House
Percy-Lobdell Building

Riviere House
Robichaux House
St. Joseph Co-Cathedral and Rectory

See also
 National Register of Historic Places listings in Lafourche Parish, Louisiana

References

Notes

Commercial buildings on the National Register of Historic Places in Louisiana
Commercial buildings completed in 1900
Italianate architecture in Louisiana
Lafourche Parish, Louisiana
National Register of Historic Places in Lafourche Parish, Louisiana